Scott Taylor may refer to:

Sport
 Scott Taylor (Australian footballer) (born 1976), Australian rules footballer for the Western Bulldogs
 Scott Taylor (darts player) (born 1991), English darts player
 Scott Taylor (footballer, born 1970), English football player
 Scott Taylor (footballer, born 1976), English football player
 Scott Taylor (left-handed pitcher) (born 1967), MLB left-handed pitcher for the Boston Red Sox, 1992–1993
 Scott Taylor (pentathlete) (born 1945), American modern pentathlete
 Scott Taylor (racing driver) (born 1955), professional off-road racing driver
 Scott Taylor (right-handed pitcher) (born 1966), MLB right-handed pitcher for the Texas Rangers, 1995
 Scott Taylor (rugby league) (born 1991), rugby league player for Hull FC
 Scott Garland (wrestler) (born 1973), professional wrestler who used the ring name Scott Taylor

Other occupations
 Scott Taylor (actor) (born 1982), English actor
 Scott Taylor (journalist) (born 1960), Canadian journalist
 Scott Taylor (politician) (born 1979), Virginia politician
 Scott Taylor (writer), Australian television writer
 M. Scott Taylor (born 1960), Canadian economist
 Scott Taylor (1961 – 2020), English guitarist and member of Then Jerico

Other uses
 "Scott Taylor", a song by Colonel Claypool's Bucket of Bernie Brains from the album The Big Eyeball in the Sky